Travis Graham (born 8 May 1993) is a South African soccer player who plays as a midfielder for Maritzburg United F.C. in the Premier Soccer League. He is a product of Ajax Cape Town's youth academy, and was first called up for the senior squad in July 2012. In his first season as a senior squad member he played 13 times making his debut against in a 3-1 defeat against Moroka Swallows, and getting a yellow card. He played for Ajax for the next six years until his release on 1 July 2018. He was without a club until 21 February 2019, where he was signed by Cape Town City. He only played one game and was released at the end of the season. He signed for Cape Umoya United on 24 February 2020. He left the club on 1 October, but was quickly signed by Maritzburg on 4 December 2020. 

He won the MTN 8 playing for Cape Town City in 2019 and in 2015 playing for Ajax.

References

External links

1993 births
South African soccer players
Living people
Association football midfielders
Soccer players from Cape Town
Cape Town Spurs F.C. players
Cape Town City F.C. (2016) players
Cape Umoya United F.C. players
Maritzburg United F.C. players
Cape Coloureds